Vama Veche was a Romanian soft rock band, founded in 1996, the same year in which they recorded the song that would become a big hit in Romania the following year, "Nu am chef azi", with their first concert taking place on 28 November 1996 at Lăptaria lui Enache.

The third album released by the band was a concept album, suggesting that the group may turn towards progressive rock. The album was received with critical acclaim.

Discography
1998 - Nu am chef azi
1999 - Vama Veche
2000 - Nu ne mai trageţi pe dreapta (maxi-single)
2002 - Am să mă întorc bărbat
2004 - Best of Vama Veche
2005 - Vama Veche Live
2006 - Fericire în rate

External links 
 Official Site
 archive of Official site

Romanian musical groups